Mai Salem Butros Sweilem (born 25 September 1995), known as Mai Sweilem, is a Jordanian footballer, who plays as a midfielder for the Turkish Women's Super League club Konak Belediyespor and the Jordan women's national team.

Club career
In December 2021, Sweilem moved to Turkey to join the İzmir-based club Konak Belediyespor in the 2021-22 Women's Super League.

International goals

References 

1995 births
Living people
Jordanian women's footballers
Jordan women's international footballers
Women's association football midfielders
Footballers at the 2014 Asian Games
Asian Games competitors for Jordan
Jordanian expatriate footballers
Jordanian expatriate sportspeople in Turkey
Expatriate women's footballers in Turkey
Konak Belediyespor players
Turkish Women's Football Super League players
Saudi Women's Premier League players